The 2015–16 UTSA Roadrunners men's basketball team represented the University of Texas at San Antonio during the 2015–16 NCAA Division I men's basketball season. The Roadrunners, led by tenth-year head coach Brooks Thompson, played their home games at the Convocation Center and were members of Conference USA. They finished the season 5-27, 3-15 in C-USA play to finish in last place. They lost in the first round of the C-USA tournament to Florida Atlantic.

On March 10, 2016, head coach Brooks Thompson was fired. He finished at UTSA with a 10-year record of 130–176. On April 1, the school hired Steven Hensen as head coach.

Previous season
The Roadrunners finished the 2014–15 season 14–16, 8–10 in C-USA play in a 4-way tie for 7th place. They lost in the first round of the C-USA tournament to FIU.

Departures

Incoming Transfers

Class of 2015 recruits

Roster

Schedule

|-
!colspan=9 style="background:#E74F00; color:#00438C;"| Exhibition

|-
!colspan=9 style="background:#E74F00; color:#00438C;"| Non-conference regular season
 

|-
!colspan=9 style="background:#E74F00; color:#00438C;"| Conference USA Regular season

|-
!colspan=9 style="background:#E74F00; color:#00438C;"| Conference USA tournament

References

UTSA Roadrunners men's basketball seasons
UTSA
UTSA Roadrunners
UTSA Roadrunners